Building Bridges is the title of the third solo album by the Christian singer-songwriter Paul Field.

Track listing

Side one 
 "Rescued for a Reason" (Paul Field/Dave Cooke)
 "Building Bridges" (Paul Field/Dave Cooke)
 "Return to Love" (Paul Field/Roy Martin)
 "Light Across the World" (Paul Field/Dave Cooke)

Side two 
 "Heartbeat of the Night" (Paul Field/Dave Cooke)
 "Song for a Stranger" (Paul Field)
 "Dangerous Game" (Paul Field/Dave Cooke)
 "Keep Your Eyes on Jesus" (Paul Field/Dave Cooke)
 "Sing a New Song" (Paul Field)

Personnel 
Paul Field: Vocals and Piano
Dave Cooke: Piano, Keyboards, Drums, Bass, Percussion and Vocals
John Clark: Guitar
Paul Westwood: Bass
Nick Pentelow: Saxophone
Mark Williamson: Backing vocals
Chris Eaton: Backing vocals
Marilyn David: Backing vocals
Laurence Burrage:Drums

Production notes 
Produced by Dave Cooke, Laurence Burrage and Paul Field
Engineered by Laurence Burrage
Recorded at Cloud Nine, Hambledon, Surrey

1984 albums
Paul Field (Christian singer) albums